Afzal Baig (born 10 April 1984, Ghakhar Mandi) is a Pakistani athlete.

Career
Afzal comes from Ghakhar Mandi in Punjab, Pakistan. He represents Pakistan Wapda in national competitions. He won various titles during representing Pakistan.

See also
Liaquat Ali, contemporary competitor in the same events

References

Living people
Pakistani male sprinters
Athletes from Punjab, Pakistan
1984 births
People from Gujranwala District
21st-century Pakistani people